Hyponeoidae is a family of crustaceans belonging to the order Siphonostomatoida.

Genera:
 Greeniedeets Benz, 2006
 Hyponeo Heegaard, 1962
 Tautochondria Ho, 1987

References

Siphonostomatoida